In ethics, a "universal code of ethics" is a system of ethics that can apply to every sentient being.

History
Kant believed that what created the problem of ethical behavior is the duality of human nature. Since humans are both sensible and intellectual, and at the same time motivated by impulse, they must be guided by rules of conduct to balance the two. He believed that everyone could decide right or wrong based on the will behind the action, rather than the action itself. In deciding whether one's actions were moral, he said it should be considered what the universal benefit would be if everyone behaved in such a fashion. For example, if everyone stole, the result would be chaos and violence. Therefore, a moral person would consider it unethical to steal. In abiding by these laws, it is possible to see how a universal code of ethics could be built up.

However, men like Marx and Engels believed that there could be no universal code of ethics because all ethics and philosophy are relative to the economic situations of each individual society. Therefore, each society would create its own system of ethics based on its economic status and history, and the current system of ethics would soon give way to a new one. Thus all morals and ethics are relative.

Later codes of ethics, such as that of Max Stirner, stated that the only ethics that existed were those that benefited the self. The common good and the love of one's fellow man, he claimed, were only illusory. Men who were exceptional in some way (intelligence or rank) were always the exception to moral standards. Nietzsche founded his ethical principles on this basis; he believed that everything powerful men did was defined as moral.

Universal ethics
There are several ethical standards that are considered to be self-evident, and seem to apply to all people throughout all of history, regardless of cultural, political, social, or economic context.  The non-aggression principle, which prohibits aggression, or the initiation of force or violence against another person, is a universal ethical principle.  Examples of aggression include murder, rape, kidnapping, assault, robbery, theft, and vandalism.  On the other hand, the commission of any of such acts in response to aggression does not necessarily violate universal ethics.

Reasons
There are obvious reasons why universal ethics are beneficial to society.  For example, if people were allowed to kill or steal, this would lead to widespread chaos and violence, and would be detrimental to the well-being of society.  Most people agree that it's better to prohibit aggression than to allow everyone to commit it.  Therefore, aggression is intrinsically immoral. Although nearly all societies have laws prohibiting aggression, this does not mean that universal ethics are necessarily reflected by that society's government or its dominant ideology...

See also
 Ethics

Notes

References
Hauser, Marc D. Moral Minds: the Nature of right and Wrong 2006. HarperCollins Publishers, New York, New York.
"Rigour, respect and responsibility: A universal ethical code for scientists.", Department for Business, Enterprise and Regulatory Reform. 
"Philosophy:Ethics:History", Open Site.

Ethics